This is a list of transactions that have taken place during the 2022 NBA off-season and the 2022–23 NBA season.

Retirement

Front office movements

Head coaching changes
Off-season

In-Season

Player movements

Trades

Free agents
The NBA's free agency period began on June 30 at 6 P.M. EST.

Players were allowed to sign new offers starting on July 6 at 12 p.m. ET, after the moratorium ended.

* Player option
** Team option
*** Early termination option

Two-way contracts
Per recent NBA rules implemented as of the 2017–18 season, teams are permitted to have two two-way players on their roster at any given time, in addition to their 15-man regular season roster. A two-way player will provide services primarily to the team's G League affiliate, but can spend up to 45 days with the parent NBA team. Only players with four or fewer years of NBA experience are able to sign two-way contracts, which can be for either one season or two. Players entering training camp for a team have a chance to convert their training camp deal into a two-way contract if they prove themselves worthy enough for it. Teams also have the option to convert a two-way contract into a regular, minimum-salary NBA contract, at which point the player becomes a regular member of the parent NBA team. Two-way players are not eligible for NBA playoff rosters, so a team must convert any two-way players it wants to use in the playoffs, waiving another player in the process.

Going to other American and Canadian leagues
The new league of all players is NBA G League, although some players have returned to their former team, as shown below. The NBA contract status of nearly all players is unrestricted free agent, and the rest is stated otherwise.

Going abroad

The following players were on NBA rosters during the previous season, but chose to sign with abroad teams after their contract expired and they became free agents. The players became free agents at the end of the season unless noted otherwise. The list also includes unsigned 2022 draft picks who signed with overseas teams, but excludes unsigned 2021 draft picks who were already playing overseas before the draft.

Waived

Training camp cuts
All players listed did not make the final roster.† On a two-way contract.© Claimed off waivers by another team.

Draft

The 2022 NBA draft was held on June 23, 2022, at Barclays Center in Brooklyn, New York. In two rounds of draft, 58 amateur United States college basketball players and other eligible players, including international players, was selected. The following players signed a regular rookie contract unless noted otherwise.

First round

Second round

Previous years' draftees

Renounced draft rights

Notes

References

External links
 NBA player transactions at NBA.com

Transactions
2022-23